Lee Seung-gi (born January 13, 1987) is a South Korean singer, actor, host and entertainer. His discography consists of seven Korean albums, one Japanese album, two album covers, one extended play and thirteen singles.

Studio albums

Cover albums

Live and compilation albums

Extended plays

Singles

Soundtrack appearances

Other charted songs

Music videos

Notes

References

Discographies of South Korean artists
Pop music discographies